"Revolution" is a song on the album Angel of Retribution, by the heavy metal band Judas Priest. It was their first single since 1992's "Night Crawler" to enter in the United States charts. It reached  in the Mainstream Rock Tracks chart.

According to the producer, Roy Z:

K. K. Downing said yet that:

It was well received by the fans and it is still played live since its release.

The song has a similar riff to "Mountain Song", by Jane's Addiction.

Chart performance

References

External links
Revolution info's
[ Chart]

Songs about revolutions
Judas Priest songs
2005 singles
Songs written by Rob Halford
Songs written by Glenn Tipton
Songs written by K. K. Downing
2004 songs